Avres Morad (also Romanized as Āvres Morād; also known as Ābres va Morād) is a village in Gevar Rural District, Sarduiyeh District, Jiroft County, Kerman Province, Iran. At the 2006 census, its population was 96, in 19 families.

References 

Populated places in Jiroft County